The Song conquest of Northern Han occurred in 979, when Northern Song forces captured the Northern Han capital of Taiyuan in present-day Shanxi Province after a two-month siege. A relief attempt by forces of the Liao dynasty, which was allied to the Northern Han, was easily defeated by the Northern Song. Yelü Dilie, a cousin of the Emperor Jingzong of Liao, was killed along Yelü Sha's son Yelü Deli (耶律德裏).

Notes and references

 

979
10th century in China
Wars involving the Song dynasty
Wars of the Five Dynasties and Ten Kingdoms
Northern Han